The Boston Artists' Association (1841–1851) was established in Boston, Massachusetts by Washington Allston, Henry Sargent, and other painters, sculptors, and architects, in order to organize exhibitions, a school, a workspace for members, and to promote art "for the art's sake."

History

According to the group's constitution: "The artists of Boston, deeply impressed with the importance of their profession, and with the necessity of a systematic course of study for its successful culmination; also with the advantages to be derived from mutual co-operation and support, resolve to form themselves into an association for the furtherance of these objects. In so doing, they pledge to each other their honor as gentlemen, to lay aside all ungenerous, envious, or selfish feelings, and to seek the advancement of the arts alone, for the art's sake."

There were "44 members in 1842, and 66 in 1845." They held "regularly scheduled bi-weekly social meetings" in Chester Harding's space on School Street. In the association's "studio ... both living models and casts were provided for members." The association "had casts donated to them by member Henry Sargent, and negotiated to borrow some of those at the Athenaeum." A school was organized in 1842, overseen by John Pope. Instructors included Samuel P. Long and B.F. Nutting. The school was located at first in Harding's Gallery on School Street, and from 1846 in rented rooms on Tremont Row.

Images

Members

 Francis Alexander
 Washington Allston
 Joseph Alexander Ames (i.e. Joseph Eames)
 Joseph Andrews
 Thomas G. Appleton
 Thomas Ball
 Hammatt Billings
 Joseph Edward Billings
 Edward Augustus Brackett
 Joseph Carew
 Henry Dexter
 George Fuller
 Samuel Gerry
 Edward D. Greene
 Henry Greenough
 Richard Saltonstall Greenough
 Chester Harding
 Joshua H. Hayward
 A.G. Hoit
 George Hollingsworth
 Charles Hubbard
 D.C. Johnston
 Charles Lane
 Fitz Hugh Lane
 P. Mallory
 N.B. Onthank
 John Pope
 Henry Cheever Pratt
 Thomas Buchanan Read
 J. Rogers
 Eastman Sanburn
 Henry Sargent
 William Sharp
 George G. Smith
 William E. Smith
 W. Southworth
 Charles J. Sprague
 Richard M. Staigg
 W.W. Story
 Asa Coolidge Warren
 M.J. Whipple
 Ammi B. Young

Exhibitions
 1842 - 1st Boston Artists' Association exhibit, at Harding's Gallery. Included: Henry Sargent;  Fitz Henry Lane;  Tintoretto; Anthony van Dyck;  Caroline Negus;  and others.
 1843 - 2nd Boston Artists' Association exhibit, at Harding's Gallery. Included: Thomas Cole;  Philip Harry; Asher Brown Durand;  Thomas Sully;  and others.  Lenders to the exhibit: E. Haskett Derby;  David Sears;  George Howe;  T. Whittemore; Boston Museum; C. Kimball; and others.
 1844 - 3rd Boston Artists' Association exhibit, at Harding's Gallery. Lenders to the exhibit: Professor Ticknor; Mrs. Allston; Col. H. Sargent; T.H. Perkins; Daniel Webster; J.B. Joy; H.C. Stebbins; Mrs. Wheelock.
 1845 - Joint exhibition of the Boston Artists' Association and the Boston Athenaeum.
 1846 - Joint exhibition of the Boston Artists' Association and the Boston Athenaeum.
 1847 - Joint exhibition of the Boston Artists' Association and the Boston Athenaeum.

See also

 Harding's Gallery (Boston)

References

1841 establishments in Massachusetts
1851 disestablishments in Massachusetts
Cultural history of Boston
Financial District, Boston
19th century in Boston
1840s in the United States